Peizermade is a hamlet in the Netherlands and is part of the Noordenveld municipality in Drenthe.

Overview 
Peizermade is a statistical entity, however the postal authorities have placed it under Peize. It was first mentioned in 1899, and means the meadow belonging to Peize. It is mainly a linear settlement along the N372.

Gallery

References 

Populated places in Drenthe
Noordenveld